Noel Lynch (born 8 October 1955) is an Irish archer. He competed at the 1988 Summer Olympics and the 1992 Summer Olympics.

References

External links
 

1955 births
Living people
Irish male archers
Olympic archers of Ireland
Archers at the 1988 Summer Olympics
Archers at the 1992 Summer Olympics
Place of birth missing (living people)